is a district located in Kumamoto Prefecture, Japan.

As of the Koshi merger (but with 2003 population statistics), the district has an estimated population of 58,300 and a density of 427 persons per square kilometer. The total area is 136.66 km2.

Towns
Kikuyō
Ōzu

Mergers
See merger and dissolution of municipalities of Japan.
On March 22, 2005 the towns of Shichijō and Shisui, and the village of Kyokushi merged into the expanded city of Kikuchi.
On February 27, 2006 the towns of Kōshi and Nishigōshi merged to form the new city of Kōshi.

Districts in Kumamoto Prefecture